1969 Scottish League Cup final may refer to:

 1969 Scottish League Cup final (April), the final of the 1968–69 Scottish League Cup, delayed from October 1968 because of a fire at Hampden Park, contested between Celtic and Hibernian
 1969 Scottish League Cup final (October), the final of the 1969–70 Scottish League Cup, contested between Celtic and St. Johnstone